The 2023 Florida Gators football team will represent the University of Florida in the Eastern Division of the Southeastern Conference (SEC) during the 2023 NCAA Division I FBS football season. The Gators are expected to be led by Billy Napier in his second season as head coach. 

The Gators play their home games at Ben Hill Griffin Stadium in Gainesville, Florida.

Schedule

References

Florida
Florida Gators football seasons
Florida Gators football